The 1931 Wake Forest Demon Deacons football team was an American football team that represented Wake Forest University during the 1931 college football season. In its third season under head coach Pat Miller, the team compiled a 4–4 record.

Schedule

References

Wake Forest
Wake Forest Demon Deacons football seasons
Wake Forest Demon Deacons football